Park Jung-Hoon (born 28 June 1988) is a South Korean footballer who plays as a midfielder for Goyang Hi FC in K League Challenge. Besides South Korea, he has played in France.

References

External links 
 

1988 births
Living people
Association football midfielders
South Korean footballers
Jeonbuk Hyundai Motors players
Jeonnam Dragons players
Gangwon FC players
Ulsan Hyundai Mipo Dockyard FC players
Bucheon FC 1995 players
Goyang Zaicro FC players
K League 1 players
K League 2 players
Korea National League players
Korea University alumni